The knockout stage of UEFA Euro 1984 was a single-elimination tournament involving the four teams that qualified from the group stage of the tournament. There were two rounds of matches: a semi-final stage leading to the final to decide the champions. The knockout stage began with the semi-finals on 23 June and ended with the final on 27 June at the Parc des Princes in Paris. France won the tournament with a 2–0 victory over Spain.

All times Central European Summer Time (UTC+2)

Format
Any game in the knockout stage that was undecided by the end of the regular 90 minutes was followed by thirty minutes of extra time (two 15-minute halves). If scores were still level after 30 minutes of extra time, there would be a penalty shootout (at least five penalties each, and more if necessary) to determine who progressed to the next round. For the first time at a European Championship, there was no third place play-off.

Qualified teams
The top two placed teams from each of the two groups qualified for the knockout stage.

Bracket

Semi-finals

France vs Portugal

Denmark vs Spain

Final

References

External links

 UEFA Euro 1984 official history

Knockout stage
1984
Knockout stage
Knockout stage
Knockout stage
Knockout stage